Keith Manning Baldwin (born October 13, 1960) is a former American football defensive end who played six seasons in the National Football League (NFL) with the Cleveland Browns and San Diego Chargers. He was drafted by the Browns in the second round of the 1982 NFL Draft. He played college football at Texas A&M University and attended M. B. Smiley High School in Houston, Texas.

Baldwin signed with the Los Angeles Raiders on November 11, 1988. He was released by the Raiders on November 30, 1988.

References

External links
Just Sports Stats

Living people
1960 births
American football defensive ends
African-American players of American football
Texas A&M Aggies football players
Cleveland Browns players
San Diego Chargers players
Los Angeles Raiders players
Players of American football from Houston
21st-century African-American sportspeople
20th-century African-American sportspeople